The Dodge M1918 light repair truck (G10) was an open cab pickup used to carry tools for emergency repair of vehicles. It was used by the U.S. Army during and after World War I.

Specifications
The truck consists of a small steel body, built by Insley Manufacturing Co. mounted on a Dodge commercial car chassis. It carries chests containing carpenter's and mechanic's tools, supplies, and lubricants for emergency repair. It was issued to heavy motorized regiments, machine-gun battalions, mobile ordnance repair shops, Ammunition trains, etc. this was the first example of what the modern army calls a contact truck.

Surviving Examples
 there is one at the Fort MacArthur museum.
 a second one at The Pennsylvania Military Museum
 and at least three in private collections

See also

 G-numbers (G10)
 List of Dodge automobiles
 Motor Transport Corps (United States Army) (World War I)
 Dodge WC series
 Liberty truck

References

 Handbook of Ordnance Data 1918
 Service handbook of the 155-mm howitzer matériel, model of 1918 (Schneider) page 109-111
 America's Munitions 1917–1918 (1919)

External links

 https://books.google.com/books?id=JM5BAAAAIAAJ&pg=PA65&dq=the+steering+wheel++motor+transport+corps&ei=ZXhfSu2XJIz-lQTd7sDHBg page 61 para. 261

Military vehicles of the United States
Vehicles by supply catalog designation
Vehicles by supply catalog designation
World War I vehicles
Military vehicles introduced in the 1910s